Rudra Mohammad Shahidullah (16 October 1956 – 21 June 1991) was a Bangladeshi poet noted for his revolutionary and romantic poetry. He is considered one of the leading Bengali poets of the 1970s. He received Munir Chaudhury Memorial Award in 1980.

He is most notable for writing the song "ভালো আছি ভালো থেকো" (Bhālō āchi bhālō thēkō) also known as "আমার ভিতর বাহিরে অন্তরে অন্তরে"(Āmāra bhitara bāhirē antarē antarē). The song was later used in various Bengali movies and television dramas.

Life 
Shahidullah was born on 16 October 1956 in Barisal.

He was a student of Dhaka West End School. From this school he passed Secondary School Certificate (SSC) in 1973 and Higher Secondary School Certificate (HSC) in 1975. Then got his master's degree in Bangla from the University of Dhaka in 1983.

In 1982, Taslima Nasrin fell in love with Rudra and fled home to marry him. They divorced in 1986. He died on 21 June 1991 as a result of drug abuse and depression.

Literary works 
Collection of poems
 Upodruto Upokul (1979)
 Firey Chai Swarno Gram (1981)
 Manusher Manchitra (1984)
 Chhobolo (1986)
 Galpa (1987)
 Diyechhilo Shokol Akash (1988)
 Moulik Mukhosh (1990)

Poems

Short stories
 Sonali Shishir

Play
 Bish Briksher Bij

Awards 
 1980: Munier Choudhury Memorial Literary Award for his poetry book, Upodruto Upokul.
 1981: Munier Choudhury Memorial Literary Award for his poetry book, Firey Chai Swarnagram. 
 1997: Bangladesh Chalachitra Sangbadik Samity award (posthumous) for the poem Amar Bhitor Bahire Ontore Ontore

Rudra Mela 
Rudra Smriti Sangsad organises an annual fair named Rudra Mela, in memory of poet Rudra Mohammad Shahidullah.

References 

1956 births
1991 deaths
People from Bagerhat District
Bangladeshi male poets
Bengali poets
Bengali male poets
20th-century poets
20th-century Bengali poets
20th-century Bangladeshi male writers